Hannah M. Cotton-Paltiel is the Shalom Horowitz Professor of Classics in the Hebrew University of Jerusalem. She was head of its classics department until 2005. She is a classical texts researcher, and former editor of Scripta Classica Israelica. She teaches Latin language and Roman history. She is married to Ari Paltiel.

Selected publications

References

External links
University directory entry
University listing

Living people
Year of birth missing (living people)
Israeli classical scholars
Women classical scholars
Academic staff of the Hebrew University of Jerusalem